The Cyprus Cycling Federation (CCF) (Greek: Κυπριακή Ομοσπονδία Ποδηλασίας, Κ.Ο.ΠΟ) is the national governing body of cycle racing in Cyprus.

The CCF is a member of the UCI and the UEC.

External links
 Cyprus Cycling Federation official website

National members of the European Cycling Union
Cycle racing organizations
Sports governing bodies in Cyprus
Cycle racing in Cyprus